Syreeta is the debut studio album by American R&B and soul singer and songwriter Syreeta Wright, released on June 20, 1972, on MoWest, a subsidiary of Motown Records.

The self-titled debut album was produced by Wright's ex-husband, frequent collaborator and musician Stevie Wonder; it was released following the former couple's separation and subsequent divorce. The album featured compositions by both Wonder and Wright, and also featured Wright's takes on other artists' songs. This included a Wonder-produced, funk-oriented version of his earlier recording, "I Love Every Little Thing About You", which was initially recorded by Wonder for his Music of My Mind project, released earlier that year.

Wonder and Wright used the talk box prominently on Wright's cover of the Beatles' "She's Leaving Home" while Wright provided a smoother vocal take of Smokey Robinson's "What Love Has Joined Together". Wright wrote the ballad "Happiness" and she and Wonder co-wrote "Baby Don't You Let Me Lose This", and their featured duet "To Know You Is to Love You" together. The album failed to generate success, though Wright would go on to a productive solo career throughout the 1970s and 1980s. Wright and Wonder continued working together for several decades.

Track listing
Side one
"I Love Every Little Thing About You" (Stevie Wonder) (4:58)
"Black Maybe" (Wonder) (4:35)
"Keep Him Like He Is" (Wonder, Syreeta Wright) (2:53)
"Happiness" (Wright) (5:19)
Side two
"She's Leaving Home" (John Lennon, Paul McCartney) (4:20)
"What Love Has Joined Together" (Smokey Robinson, Bobby Rogers) (3:37)
"How Many Days" (Wonder) (3:35)
"Baby Don't You Let Me Lose This" (Wonder, Wright) (2:57)
"To Know You Is to Love You" (Wonder, Wright) (with Stevie Wonder) (5:18)

Personnel
Syreeta Wright - lead vocals, backing vocals
Buzzy Feiten - guitar
Scott Gordon Edwards - bass
Keith Copeland - drums
Trevor Lawrence - bell tree on "Keep Him Like He Is"
Gloria Barley, Jim Gilstrap, Lani Groves, Linda Tucker - backing vocals
Stevie Wonder - all other instruments
Julian Gaillard Orchestra - strings
Technical

 Stevie Wonder, Trevor Lawrence, Yusuf Rahman - arrangements

Robert Margouleff and Malcolm Cecil - associate producers, synthesizer programming
Andy Edlen, Dick Shapiro, Joan DeCola - recordists
David Weissman - art direction
Robert Margouleff - cover photography

References

1972 debut albums
Syreeta albums
Motown albums
Albums produced by Stevie Wonder
Albums recorded at Olympic Sound Studios
Albums recorded at Electric Lady Studios